The 1994 World Cup of Golf took place November 10–13 at the Hyatt Dorado Beach Resort in Puerto Rico. It was the 40th World Cup. The tournament was a 72-hole stroke play team event with each team consisting of two players from a country. The combined score of each team determined the team results. Individuals also competed for the International Trophy. The winners share of the prize money was $300,000 going to the winning pair and $100,000 to the top individual. The United States team of Fred Couples and Davis Love won (for the third time in a row with the same players in the team) by 14 strokes over the Zimbabwe team of Mark McNulty and Tony Johnstone. Couples took the International Trophy by five strokes over Costantino Rocca of Italy.

Teams 

(a) denotes amateur

Scores
Team

Jamaica was disqualified because Seymour Rose signed an incorrect scorecard. His teammate Ralph Mairs completed the competition.

International Trophy

References

World Cup (men's golf)
Golf tournaments in Puerto Rico
World Cup golf
World Cup golf
World Cup golf